Typhoon No.15 ~B'z Live-Gym The Final Pleasure "It's Showtime!!" in Nagisaen~ is the fifth live VHS/DVD released by Japanese rock duo B'z. It is a triple DVD which features live footage of one of their famous Live Gym Tours.

Track listing

Disc One 

Pleasure 2003 ~Jinsei no Kairaku~ (Pleasure 2003 ~人生の快楽~) 
Blowin'
Oh! Girl
Wonderful Opportunity
Yasei no Energy (野性のEnergy)
Time
Taiyou no Komachi Angel (太陽のKomachi Angel)
Gimme Your Love -Fukutsu no Love Driver- (Gimme Your Love -不屈のLove Driver- )
Konya Tsuki no Mieru Oka ni (今夜月の見える丘に)
Brotherhood
Easy Come, Easy Go!
Gekkou (月光)
Koi-Gokoro

Disc Two 
Real Thing Shakes
Love Phantom
Zero
Juice
Ultra Soul
It's Showtime!!
Bad Communication
Ai no mama ni Wagamama ni Boku wa Kimi dake wo Kizutsukenai (愛のままにわがままに 僕は君だけを傷つけない)
Hadashi no megami (裸足の女神)
Run

Disc Three 
Recording in L.A. 
It's Showtime!!
Live-Gym Rehearsal
It's Showcase!! 
Hall Tour 1 
Yasei no Energy (野性のEnergy)
Hall Tour 2 
In Nagisaen

Certifications

External links 
B'z Official Website 

B'z video albums
2004 video albums